The pinto bean is a variety of common bean (Phaseolus vulgaris). In Spanish they are called , literally "painted bean" (compare pinto horse). It is the most popular bean by crop production in Northern Mexico and the Southwestern United States, and is most often eaten whole (sometimes in broth), or mashed and then refried. Either way, it is a common filling for burritos, tostadas, or tacos in Mexican cuisine, also as a side or as part of an entrée served with a side tortilla or sopaipilla in New Mexican cuisine.

Additionally, the young immature pods may be harvested and cooked as green pinto beans. There are a number of different varieties of pinto bean, notably some originating from Northern Spain, where an annual fair is dedicated to the bean.

Use
The dried pinto bean is the bean commonly used reconstituted or canned in many dishes, especially refried beans. It is popular in chili con carne, although kidney beans, black beans, and many others may be used in other locales.

Pinto beans are often found in Brazilian cuisine.  Legumes, mainly the common bean, are a staple food everywhere in the country, cultivated since 3000 BC, along with starch-rich foods, such as rice, manioc, pasta, and other wheat-based products, polenta and other corn-based products, potatoes and yams. Pinto beans are also a very important ingredient in Spanish cuisine and Mexican cuisine.

In Spanish cuisine pinto beans are mostly used in a dish named after them.

In the Southern United States, pinto beans were once a staple, especially during the winter months. Some organizations and churches in rural areas still sponsor "pinto bean suppers" for social gatherings and fund raisers.

Varieties

Pinto bean varieties include: 'Burke', 'Hidatsa', and 'Othello'.

The alubia pinta alavesa, or the "Alavese pinto bean", a red variety of the pinto bean, originated in Añana, a town and municipality located in the province of Álava, in the Basque Country of northern Spain. In October, the Feria de la alubia pinta alavesa (Alavese pinto bean fair) is celebrated in Pobes.

Cooking
Pinto beans are often soaked, which greatly shortens cooking time. If unsoaked, they are frequently boiled rapidly for 10 minutes. They will then generally take two to three hours to cook on a stove to soften. In a pressure cooker they will cook very rapidly, perhaps 3 minutes if soaked, and 20-45 minutes if unsoaked. Cooking times vary considerably however and may depend on the source of the bean, hardness of the cooking water and many other factors.

Nutrition
A nutrient-dense legume, the pinto bean contains many essential nutrients. It is a good source of protein, phosphorus and manganese, and very high in dietary fiber and folate.

Rice and pinto beans served with cornbread or corn tortillas are often a staple meal where meat is unavailable. This combination contains the essential amino acids necessary for humans in adequate amounts: corn complements beans' relative scarcity of methionine and cystine and beans complement corn's relative scarcity of lysine and tryptophan.

Studies have indicated pinto beans can lower the levels of both HDL and LDL cholesterol. Pinto beans have also been shown to contain the phytoestrogen coumestrol, which has a variety of possible health effects.

Pinto beans have long been associated with flatulence. According to historian Alfred Crosby, this was not true prior to the Columbian Exchange. Indigenous cultures instead soaked beans several times as opposed to Europeans who came from more arid climates and generally soaked beans at much lower levels.

See also
 Gallo pinto

References

External links

 

Phaseolus
Edible legumes
Symbols of New Mexico